The Man Who Invented the Twentieth Century: Nikola Tesla, forgotten genius of electricity ( : OCLC 40839685) is a 1999 book by Robert Lomas detailing the life of Nikola Tesla. Lomas covers the times of the electric engineer in the United States and the inventors' work.

1999 non-fiction books
Books about Nikola Tesla